Gord Hill (born 1968) is an artist, author, political activist, and member of the Kwakwaka'wakw nation. He has worked as an advocate for Indigenous people since 1988, participating in numerous protests, blockades, rallies, and other movements. He lives in Downtown Eastside, Vancouver, British Columbia. Hill is best-known for his series of graphic novels detailing various issues regarding indigenous decolonization, anti-capitalism, anti-globalization and anti-fascism, with a specific focus on armed struggle.

Activism
Hill's political activism goes back to the 1990s, and includes involvement or solidarity with the Indigenous People's Movement, the Oka Crisis, the 500 Years of Resistance campaign, the Zapatista uprising, the Gustafsen Lake standoff, the Ipperwash Crisis, the Native Youth Movement, the 1999 Seattle WTO protests, the Cheam Indian Band fisheries dispute, the 3rd Summit of the Americas protests, the Skwelkwek'welt campaign, and the anti- 2010 Winter Olympics campaign.

Under the pseudonym Zig Zag, Hill runs a blog called Warrior Publications, documenting protests and resistance of Indigenous peoples all around the globe.

The 500 Years of Resistance Comic Book
Hill's first publication was "The 500 Years of Resistance Comic Book", which was adapted from a 1992 essay of the same name and reprinted in 2020. It features an introduction from political activist Ward Churchill.

In The 500 Years of Resistance Comic Book, Gord Hill uses the accessible comic book format to highlight the history of Indigenous resistance in the Americas, starting with the 1492 invasion of Christopher Columbus and continuing through 2006 with the Grand River land dispute. The comic book features well known clashes between colonizers and Indigenous peoples as well as events that are not commonly taught in conventional American curricula.

The book has received favorable attention from academics. On 25 October 2017, Hill was invited to discuss the book at Acadia University. He explained the cover, which features the Battle of Sitka in 1802, in which the Tlingit were able to eventually beat the Russians. In this lecture Hill also described some of his artistic influences, including Art Wilson, a Gitxsan citizen from British Columbia, Canada, who published a book in 1996 called the Heartbeat of the Earth: A First Nations Artist Records Injustice and Resistance, focusing on the struggles with logging and fisheries in Canada during the 1980s. Academic journals have written about 500 Years of Resistance positively, praising its use of the graphic form to convey colonial history as well as the perspective Hill brings to comic-book writing as an Indigenous artist.

The CBC listed the upcoming re-release of the comic book—updated with new material and an introduction from Canadian/Miꞌkmaq lawyer, professor and politician Pamela Palmater—as one of "21 Canadian comics to watch for."

The Anti-Capitalist Resistance Comic Book and The Antifa Comic Book
2012 saw the release of "The Anti-Capitalist Resistance Comic Book," which was followed thereafter by the 2018 "The Antifa Comic Book" at the behest of his publisher following the 2017 Unite the Right rally in Charlottesville, Virginia.

Publications 
 The 500 Years of Resistance Comic Book (2010) – (
 The Anti-Capitalist Resistance Comic Book: From the WTO to the G20 (2012) –
 The Antifa Comic Book (2018) –
 Direct Action Gets the Goods: A Graphic History of the Strike in Canada (2019) –
 The 500 Years of Indigenous Resistance Comic Book: Revised and Expanded (2021) –

See also 
 Gord Hill's statement on the 2010 Winter Games in Vancouver – featured on Balaclava!, a newspaper by the Vancouver Media Co-op: https://www.yumpu.com/en/document/read/53768296
 Archived version of no2010.com, a site documenting the movement against the 2010 Winter Games, maintained by Gord Hill

References 

1968 births
Living people
Kwakwaka'wakw people
21st-century First Nations writers
Writers from Vancouver
21st-century Canadian novelists
Canadian graphic novelists
Canadian male novelists
First Nations novelists